Medina is a Swedish hip hop duo formation with Arabic influences made up of Swedish artists of Tunisian  descent, being Sam-E (born Sami Daniel Rekik), a former professional football player in Tunisia and Alibi (born Ali Jammali). Sam-E is also of Finnish descent as his mother is Finnish.

Career

The two started making music in 2003 under the name Medina after they met in Knivsta promoting a special genre they called "Haffla music" with rhythm from the Arab World mixed with hip hop.

Their debut release was mixtape/album Rumble in Fiskayyet and the resulting single "Magdansös". They followed up with a series of albums, Fullblod, 7 dar, Mosh Normal, Hayat and Sista Minuten. Their single "Miss Decibel" from the album Sista Minuten reached number 2 on Sverigetopplistan, the official Swedish Singles Chart. They have also released series of 4 mixtapes under the title Varsågod de e gratis and two volumes in the series Haffla Music.

Sami Rekik of the duo took part in Melodifestivalen 2021 in collaboration with WAHL with the song "90-talet". Medina reunited to enter Melodifestivalen 2022 with the song "In i dimman" and qualified for the final from Heat 4. At the final on 12 March 2022, they gained 109 points and finished in 3rd place.

Solo projects

Ali Jammali
Ali Jammali collaborated with G Mansour co-writing 10 of the rappers 16-track album The Cage. He alsor recorded and produced the track alongside Sami Rekik in the Medina Studios.

Sami Rekik
Sam-E has released his own solo releases including the album Om ni ba Wuisste and collaborated with other artists including with OIAM in "Avundsjuka", a charting hit on Sverigetopplistan. He has also collaborated with SödraSidan, Alpis, Petter, Anis Don Demina, Elias Abbas and many others.

In 2021, Sami Rekik under the mononym SAMI took part in Melodifestivalen 2021 with the song "90-talet" alongside member of duo SödraSidan Christopher Wahlberg under the stage name WAHL. The duo performed their song on 13 February 2021 during the second semi-final of the qualification round for Eurovision Song Contest for representing Sweden in Eurovision. WAHL featuring SAMI, the song came 6th of 7 acts during the night failing to qualify to the final or the Second Chance. However their song has charted in Sverigetopplistan, the official Swedish Singles Chart.

Discography

Albums

Mixtapes
2004: Rumble in Fiskayyet
2004: Varsågod de e gratis Vol 1 (free album online in 2005)
2009: Varsågod de e gratis Vol. 2
2010: Haffla Music Vol. 1
2010: Varsågod de e gratis Vol. 3
2011: Varsågod de e gratis Vol. 4
2011: Haffla Music Vol. 2
2012: Svarta tårar

Singles

Notes

Discography: Ali Jammali

Albums
as songwriter
2010: The Cage (by G Mansour)
Ali Jammali co-wrote 10 tracks from the 16-track album
All tracks recorded and mixed by Ali Jammali & Sami Rekik at Medina Studios

Mixtapes
Solo as Alibrorsh
2010: Parabol Paradis

Discography: Sami Rekik
(using various names, mainly Sam-E, but also the mononym Sami (SAMI))

Albums
Om ni ba Wuisste

Singles

References

External links
Official website

Swedish hip hop groups
Swedish musical duos
Hip hop duos
Swedish-language singers
Melodifestivalen contestants of 2022